Tove Edfeldt (born 24 November 1983) is a Swedish actress. She studied at the Swedish National Academy of Mime and Acting between 2004 and 2008.

Filmography
1986 – The Children of Noisy Village
1987 – More About the Children of Noisy Village
1993 – Roseanna
1997 – Sanning eller konsekvens
2000 – Barnen på Luna (TV)
2001 – Eva & Adam - fyra födelsedagar och ett fiasko
2003 – Hannah med H
2011 – The Stig-Helmer Story
2018 - Ted – För kärlekens skull

References

External links
 
 

Swedish actresses
1983 births
Living people